The Jewish Book Council, founded in 1944, is an organization encouraging and contributing to Jewish literature. The goal of the council, as stated on its website, is "to promote the reading, writing and publishing of quality English language books of Jewish content in North America". The council sponsors the National Jewish Book Awards, the Sami Rohr Prize for Jewish Literature, the JBC Network, JBC Book Clubs, the Visiting Scribe series, and Jewish Book Month. It publishes an annual literary journal called Paper Brigade.

It broke off from the JCC Association on January 1, 1994, and became an independent not-for-profit 501(c)(3) corporation chartered in the State of New York. Its primary support is from individuals, and from organizations and foundations in the Jewish community.

History 
The Council's origins date back to 1925, when Fanny Goldstein, a librarian at the West End Branch of the Boston Public Library, set up an exhibit of Judaic books as a focus of what she called Jewish Book Week. In 1927, with the assistance of Rabbi S. Felix Mendelsohn of Chicago, Jewish communities around the country adopted the event.

Jewish Book Week proved so successful that in 1940 the National Committee for Jewish Book Week was founded, with Fanny Goldstein as its chairperson. Dr. Mordecai Soltes succeeded her one year later. Representatives of major American Jewish organizations served on this committee, as did groups interested in promulgating Yiddish and Hebrew literature.

Jewish Book Week activities proliferated and were extended to a one-month period in 1943. At the same time, the National Committee for Jewish Book Week became the Jewish Book Council, reflecting its broader scope. In March of the following year, the National Jewish Welfare Board, which would ultimately become the Jewish Community Centers Association (JCCA), entered into an agreement with the Book Council to become its official sponsor and coordinating organization, providing financial support and organizational assistance. This arrangement reflected the realization that local JCCs were the primary site of community book fairs.

While under the auspices of the JCCA, the Jewish Book Council maintained an executive board, composed of representatives from major American Jewish organizations and leading figures in the literary world.

From 1942 through 1999, the council published an annual journal called the Jewish Book Annual. The journal reflected on "the year’s events, figures, works, and community interests impacting Jewish literature and literacy." In 1999, the journal transformed into the Jewish Book World, a quarterly magazine that was published through 2015.

Today 
On January 1, 1994, the Jewish Book Council became an autonomous organization. The Council's executive board voted to create an independent entity. The new organization is a not-for-profit 501(c)(3) corporation chartered in the State of New York.

Paper Brigade 
Jewish Book Council's annual literary magazine, Paper Brigade, is named in honor of the group of writers and intellectuals in the Vilna Ghetto who rescued thousands of Jewish books and documents from Nazi destruction. Each issue provides a 200-page snapshot of the Jewish literary landscape in America and abroad, including essays, fiction, poetry, and visual arts.

JBC Book Clubs 
JBC helps book clubs find reading material and discussion questions, whether the book club is formal or informal; social or educational; interested in reading only books of Jewish content, just a few Jewish books throughout the year, or good literature that happens to have Jewish themes.

Jewish Book World 

Jewish Book World was a quarterly magazine published by the Jewish Book Council from 1982 to 2015. It was devoted to the promotion of books of Jewish interest. Jewish Book World reached over 5,000 readers with a specific interest in Jewish books, including library professionals, book festival coordinators, book group members, academicians, and lay leaders. The magazine was a tool to help them learn about new books of Jewish interest and make informed reading choices. Often called "the Publishers Weekly of Jewish literature", Jewish Book World brought the world of Jewish books to interested readers. 

Jewish Book World began as a twelve-page pamphlet that was circulated to Jewish Community Centers, featuring short blurbs on approximately 50 new books of Jewish interest. In 1994, Jewish Book World expanded from a pamphlet to a full-length magazine that was published three times a year. Jewish Book World appeared quarterly and included reviews of over 120 books per issue, updates on literary events and industry news, author profiles, and articles on the world of Jewish books.

Since the discontinuance of Jewish Book World, Jewish Book Council has been publishing online content such as book reviews, author interviews, and excerpts from up-and-coming Jewish books on their website, where readers can found hundreds of new reviews each year.

The Prosenpeople 
The Prosenpeople is the Jewish Book Council's blog. It posts book reviews, excerpts, and author interviews. The Prosenpeople also includes the Visiting Scribe series, a portion of the blog which features guest bloggers. These guest bloggers offer voices from the new Jewish literary scene and are most often Jewish Book Network authors.

National Jewish Book Awards 
The National Jewish Book Awards is the longest-running North American awards program of its kind in the field of Jewish literature and is recognized as the most prestigious. The awards, presented by category, are designed to give recognition to outstanding books, to stimulate writers to further literary creativity and to encourage the reading of worthwhile titles.

The National Jewish Book Awards program began in 1950 when the Jewish Book Council presented awards to authors of Jewish books at its annual meeting. The first book awarded the prize was Philo: Foundations of Religious Philosophy in Judaism, Christianity and Islam by Harry Austryn Wolfson. Among the past notable literary winners are Sonia Levitin, Howard Fast, Chaim Grade, Samuel Heilman, John Hersey, Bernard Malamud, Cynthia Ozick, Chaim Potok, Arthur A. Cohen, Philip Roth, I.B. Singer, Michael Chabon, Lauren Belfer, and Elie Wiesel.

In addition to the category awards, every year since 2002, one non-fiction book has been selected as the winner of the Everett Family Foundation Jewish Book of the Year Award. The last winner was Daniel Gordis. With such prominent, influential thinkers participating in the program, the awards have a significant impact on American Jewish cultural life.

JBC Network 
The JBC Network is a membership organization of over 120 participating sites, JCCs, synagogues, Hillels, Jewish Federations and other related organizations that host Jewish book programs. Through the Network, the Jewish Book Council is able to provide extensive resources to the program coordinators, including introduction to authors interested in touring Jewish book festivals, advice from experts on topics that affect a book program, and a chance to learn from the experiences of others in the field.

Jewish books are an essential part of Jewish culture. Programming for Jewish book events is a vital component. In recent years, the Jewish book festivals have grown into a $3 million industry. The Jewish Book Network goes a long way towards assisting in the preparation of successful events and connecting authors of Jewish interest books with the coordinators of these programs.

The Jewish Book Council formed the JBC Network in 1999 to serve as a central address for book programming. It functions on a year-round basis, although the primary focus remains on the Fall Jewish Book Month season. The Jewish Book Council assists with program suggestions and coordinates the speaking tours of more than 260 authors who travel country-wide during the Fall season and throughout the year. The Jewish Book Council annually prepares a book providing information about the authors on tour.

Each year the Jewish Book Council sponsors a conference for all JBC Network members and their lay leaders in conjunction with the annual BookExpo America. This conference begins the new season of book festival planning. In addition to workshops and networking among the Network members, the annual conference includes a program called Meet the Author. Through this event, authors are invited to speak to the members of the JBC Network in the hopes of touring and visiting with the Jewish book programs that are represented. Among the authors who were sponsored in the past are Warren Bass, Rich Cohen, Nathan Englander, Samuel G. Freedman, Jonathan Safran Foer, Myla Goldberg, Ari L. Goldman, Rabbi Irving Greenberg, Dara Horn, David Horowitz, Dr. Eric Kandel, Nicole Krauss, Rabbi Harold Kushner, Aaron Lansky, Daniel Libeskind, Tova Mirvis, Dr. Deborah Dash Moore, Judea Pearl, Naomi Ragen, Nessa Rapoport, Shulamit Reinharz, Steven V. Roberts, Jonathan Rosen, Ambassador Dennis Ross, and Dr. Jonathan Sarna.

Sami Rohr Prize 

This is an annual $100,000 prize awarded to the finest works of Jewish interest. Established in 2006 by Sami Rohr's descendants on his 80th birthday, it is one of the richest literary prizes in the world. It alternates between fiction and non-fiction.

See also

List of winners of the National Jewish Book Award

References

External links 
Home page
Jewish Book Annual The full run of the Annual has been fully digitized by the Center for Jewish History and is text-searchable

Jewish educational organizations
Jewish American literature
Jewish organizations based in the United States
Publishing-related professional associations
Literary awards honoring minority groups
Arts organizations established in 1944
1944 establishments in the United States